Year 120 (CXX) was a leap year starting on Sunday (link will display the full calendar) of the Julian calendar. At the time, it was known as the Year of the Consulship of Severus and Fulvus (or, less frequently, year 873 Ab urbe condita). The denomination 120 for this year has been used since the early medieval period, when the Anno Domini calendar era became the prevalent method in Europe for naming years.

Events

By place

Roman Empire 
 Emperor Hadrian visits Britain.
 Foss Dyke is constructed in Britain.
 A Kushan ambassadorial contingent visits with Hadrian. 
 Suetonius becomes Hadrian's secretary ab epistolis.
 Approximate date
 Legio IX Hispana last known to be in existence.
 The Market Gate of Miletus is built at Miletos (moved in modern times to Staatliche Museen zu Berlin, Preussischer Kulturbesitz, Antikensammlung).

Asia 
 Change of era name from Yuanchu (7th year) to Yongning of the Chinese Eastern Han Dynasty.
 The Scythians dominate western India: Punjab, Sind, the north of Gujarat and a portion of central India.

Births 
 February 8 – Vettius Valens, Greek astrologer (d. 175)
 Irenaeus, Greek bishop and apologist (approximate date)
 Lucian, Syrian rhetorician and satirist (approximate date)
 Tatian, Syrian Christian writer and theologian (d. 180)

Deaths 
 Ban Zhao, Chinese historian and philosopher (b. AD 49)
 Dio Chrysostom, Greek historian (approximate date)
 Faustinus and Jovita, Roman Christian martyrs
 Getulius, Roman officer and Christian martyr
 Hermes, Greek Christian martyr and saint
 Marcian of Tortona, Roman bishop (or 117)
 Matthias of Jerusalem, bishop of Jerusalem 
 Nicomachus, Greek mathematician (b. AD 60)
 Plutarch, Greek philosopher (approximate date)
 Sextus Pedius, Roman jurist (b. AD 50)

References